Jordan River Anderson, the Messenger is a 2019 Canadian documentary film directed by Alanis Obomsawin. The film profiles Jordan River Anderson, a young boy from the Norway House Cree Nation in Manitoba whose permanent lifelong hospitalization with a rare genetic disorder caused a political fight between the provincial and federal governments over the cost of his medical care, resulting in the establishment of the new Jordan's Principle around equity of access to health and social services for First Nations children.

The film premiered at the 2019 Toronto International Film Festival. At the 2019 Vancouver International Film Festival, the film won the award for Best Canadian Documentary.

References

External links
 

2019 films
English-language Canadian films
2019 documentary films
Canadian documentary films
Documentary films about children
Documentary films about Indigenous rights in Canada
Documentary films about Canadian politics
Documentary films about health care
Documentary films about special education
Films set in Manitoba
Films set in Ontario
Films directed by Alanis Obomsawin
2010s English-language films
2010s Canadian films